Austin James Berkley (born 28 January 1973) is an English former professional footballer who played as a winger. His most successful spell was at Shrewsbury Town, where he made 174 appearances in five years, scoring 12 goals.

Career
Berkley began his career at Gillingham, making three appearances in the Football League after graduating from the youth system at the club. In May 1992, Berkley signed for Swindon Town. At Swindon, Berkley made a single league appearance, before departing to join Shrewsbury Town in July 1995. During five seasons at Shrewsbury, Berkley made 172 league appearances, scoring 12 times. Four years after leaving the club, Berkley placed third on a list of Shrewsbury in a poll conducted by BBC Sport. In July 2000, Berkley joined Barnet, being loaned to Carlisle United in August 2001. Following his spell at Barnet, Berkley dropped into Non-League football, playing for Gravesend & Northfleet, Chelmsford City, Welling United, Heybridge Swifts, Harlow Town and Croydon Athletic, before finishing his career in South London at Erith Town.

References

1973 births
Living people
Sportspeople from Dartford
Association football wingers
English footballers
Gillingham F.C. players
Swindon Town F.C. players
Shrewsbury Town F.C. players
Barnet F.C. players
Carlisle United F.C. players
Ebbsfleet United F.C. players
Chelmsford City F.C. players
Welling United F.C. players
Heybridge Swifts F.C. players
Harlow Town F.C. players
Croydon Athletic F.C. players
Erith Town F.C. players
English Football League players